Ricardo Charles (born 4 June 1983) is a Haitian footballer who plays as a striker. He plays for Victory Sportif Club and the Haiti national football team.

References

External links

Caribbean Football Database profile

1983 births
Living people
Association football forwards
Haitian footballers
People from Jérémie
Victory SC players
Ligue Haïtienne players
Haiti international footballers